Rimfire ammunition is a type of firearm metallic cartridge whose primer is located within a hollow circumferential rim protruding from the base of its casing.  When fired, the gun's firing pin will strike and crush the rim against the edge of the barrel breech, sparking the primer compound within the rim, and in turn ignite the propellant within the case.  Invented in 1845, by Louis-Nicolas Flobert, the first rimfire metallic cartridge was the .22 BB Cap (a.k.a. 6mm Flobert) cartridge, which consisted of a percussion cap with a bullet attached to the top. While many other different cartridge priming methods have been tried since the 19th century, only rimfire and the later centerfire cartridges survive to the present day with regular usages.  The .22 Long Rifle rimfire cartridge, introduced in 1887, is by far the most common ammunition in the world today in terms of units sold.

Characteristics

 
Rimfire ammunition is so named because the firing pin strikes and crushes the base's rim to ignite the primer.  The rim of such a cartridge is essentially an expanded and flattened end section of the case, and the priming compound is filled from inside into the trough cavity inside the rim.  The case is then filled with propellant powder and sealed off by the projectile (bullet). 

Rimfire cartridges are limited to low pressures because the case must be thin enough so that the firing pin can crush the rim and ignite the primer.  Rimfire cartridges of .44 caliber up to .56 caliber were once common when black powder was used as a propellant. Modern rimfire cartridges use smokeless powder which generates much higher pressures and tend to be of .22 caliber (5.5 mm) or smaller. This also means that rimfire firearms can be very light and inexpensive, as the production cost of the case material and powder load are both low, and the manufacturing process is significantly more streamlined than centerfire cartridges (which require more steps in the assembly process).  As a result, rimfire cartridges are typically very affordable, primarily because of the inherent cost-efficiency of manufacturing in large lots, which has helped lead to the continuing market popularity of these small-caliber cartridges.

History

Frenchman Louis-Nicolas Flobert invented the first rimfire metallic cartridge in 1845. The 6mm Flobert cartridge consisted of a percussion cap with a bullet attached to the top. These cartridges do not contain any powder, the only propellant substance contained in the cartridge is the percussion cap. In Europe, the .22 BB Cap (introduced in 1845) and the slightly more powerful .22 CB Cap (introduced in 1888) are both called 6mm Flobert and are considered the same cartridge.

Flobert also made what he called "parlor guns" for this cartridge, as these rifles and pistols were designed for target shooting in homes with a dedicated shooting parlor or shooting gallery. 6mm Flobert Parlor pistols came into fashion in the mid-19th century; they typically featured heavy barrels. This cartridge was improved upon by Benjamin Houllier in 1846.

The next rimfire cartridge was the .22 Short, developed for Smith & Wesson's first revolver, in 1857; it used a longer rimfire case and 4 grains (260 mg) of black powder to fire a conical bullet. According to Berkeley R. Lewis, a firearms historian, this later Smith & Wesson cartridge was 'essentially the same as Houllier's 1846 patent'. This led to the .22 Long in 1871, with the same bullet weight as the short but with a longer case and 5 grains (320 mg) of black powder. This was followed by the .22 Extra Long in 1880, with a case longer than the .22 Long and a heavier bullet.

American firearms manufacturer J. Stevens Arms & Tool Company introduced the .22 Long Rifle cartridge in 1887. It combined the casing of the .22 Long with the  bullet of the .22 Extra Long, giving it a longer overall length, a higher muzzle velocity, and superior performance as a hunting and target round, rendering both the .22 Long and .22 Extra Long cartridges obsolete. The .22 LR uses a heeled bullet, which means that the bullet is the same diameter as the case, and has a narrower "heel" portion that fits in the case. It is one of the few cartridges that are accepted by a large variety of rifles and handguns.

Larger rimfire calibers were used during the American Civil War in the Henry repeating rifle, the Spencer repeating rifle, the Ballard Rifle, and the Frank Wesson carbine. While larger rimfire calibers were made, such as the .30 rimfire, .32 rimfire, .38 rimfire .41 Short (for the Remington Model 95 derringer), the .44 Henry (for the Henry rifle and later used by the famous Winchester Model 1866), the .56-56 Spencer (for the Spencer rifle was the world's first military metallic cartridge repeating rifle), up to the .58 Miller, the larger calibers were quickly replaced by centerfire versions, and today the .22 caliber rimfires are all that survive of these early rimfire cartridges.

The early 21st century has seen a revival in .17 caliber (4.5 mm) rimfire cartridges. New and increasingly popular, the 17 HMR is based on a .22 WMR casing with a smaller formed neck which accepts a .17 bullet. The advantages of the 17 HMR over .22 WMR and other rimfire cartridges are its much flatter trajectory and its highly frangible hollow point bullets (often manufactured with plastic "ballistic tips" that improve the bullet's external ballistics). The .17 HM2 (Hornady Mach 2) is based on the .22 Long Rifle and offers similar performance advantages over its parent cartridge, at a significantly higher cost. While .17 HM2 sells for about four times the cost of .22 Long Rifle ammunition, it is still significantly cheaper than most centerfire ammunition and somewhat cheaper than the .17 HMR.  First shown at the 2013 SHOT Show, the .17 WSM uses the blank case from a .27 nail-gun necked down to accommodate a .17 caliber bullet, resulting in substantially higher muzzle velocity and energy than the .17 HMR.

Shot shells

Some .22 caliber rimfire cartridges are loaded with a small amount of No. 11 or No. 12 shot (about 1/15th ounce). This "snake shot" is only marginally effective in close ranges, and is usually used for shooting snakes, rats or other small animals. It is also useful for shooting birds inside storage buildings as it will not penetrate walls or ceilings. At a distance of about 10 feet (3.1 m), which is about the maximum effective range, the pattern is about 8 inches (20 cm) in diameter from a standard rifle. Special smoothbore shotguns, such as the Marlin Model 25MG "Garden Gun" can produce effective patterns out to 15 or 20 yards using .22 WMR shotshells, which hold 1/8 oz. of No. 11 or No. 12 shot contained in a plastic capsule.

Shotshells will not feed reliably in some magazine-fed firearms, because of the unusual shape of some cartridges that are crimped closed at the case mouth, and the relatively fragile plastic tips of other designs. Shotshells will not produce sufficient power to cycle semiautomatic actions, because, unlike projectile ammunition, nothing forms to the lands and grooves of the barrel to create the pressure necessary to cycle the firearm's action.

The 9mm Flobert is a notable rimfire cartridge that is still in production in Europe and is chambered by the Winchester Model 36 in the 1920s. This cartridge is primarily loaded with a small amount of shot, but can also fire a small ball, and is used in "garden gun", which are miniature shotguns. Its power and range are very limited, making it suitable only for pest control. An example of a rare but modern 9mm Flobert Rimfire among hunters in Europe is the 1.75-inch brass shotshell manufactured by Fiocchi in Lecco, Italy, using a .25 oz shot of No. 8 shot with a velocity of 600 fps.

Common rimfire ammunition

Below is a list of the most common current production rimfire ammunition:
 .17 Hornady Magnum Rimfire (.17 HMR), a .17 caliber cartridge based on a modified .22 WMR case
 .17 Hornady Mach 2 (.17 HM2), a .17 caliber cartridge based on a modified .22 Stinger case
 .17 Winchester Super Magnum (.17 WSM) a .17 caliber cartridge based on a modified .27 caliber nail gun blank case
 5mm Remington Rimfire Magnum (5mm RFM) a .20 caliber cartridge based on similar dimensions to a .22 WMR case
 .22 BB Cap and .22 CB Cap also known as 6mm Flobert in Europe 
 .22 Short, used for target shooting and Olympic and ISSF 25 m Rapid Fire Pistol competition, until being replaced by .22 Long Rifle in 2005
 .22 Long (obsolete but available)
 .22 Extra Long Last manufactured in 1935 it pre-dated but was superseded by the .22 LR. It has a longer case than the .22 LR with the same 40-grain bullet.
 .22 Long Rifle (.22 LR), the most common cartridge made in the world today
 .22 Stinger (a form of .22 Long Rifle with a slightly longer case and the same overall loaded length), its case is the basis for the .17 HM2
 .22 Winchester Rimfire (.22 WRF) AKA .22 Remington Special (obsolete but available)
 .22 Winchester Magnum Rimfire (.22 WMR)
 9mm Flobert is a common garden gun cartridge or shotshell used in Europe.

See also
Heeled bullet
Cartridge (firearms)
Centerfire ammunition
List of rimfire cartridges
Primer (firearm)

References

Further reading
 Suydam, Charles R. The American Cartridge: An Illustrated Study of the Rimfire Cartridge in the United States. Alhambra, Calif: Borden Pub, 1986. 

Ammunition
Rimfire cartridges